Wolfgang Boss is a German music executive, producer and president of A&R for  Sony Music Entertainment company.  
Wolfgang holds the position of Sony Music's Executive President A&R globally since 2012. With more than 100 gold and platinum certifications Wolfgang Boss is one of the most successful A&R executives of the last two decades.

Biography and musical career 
Boss entered the music world during his university studies. 
After working as a DJ, he became a club manager and established his own house music club, MACH 1. This brought him into regular contact with international DJs and artists in the house scene. In 2003 his Berlin-based company Mach 1 Records GmbH became a partner in the newly founded house label, Ministry of Sound Germany. Just one year later Boss's new label MACH 1 scored two number-one hits with Dragostea Din Tei (Haiducii) and Obsessión (Aventura). The latter held the top spot on the German charts for seven weeks.

In 2005 Boss teamed up with German producer Reinhardt "Voodoo" Reith to create the music for their Crazy Frog project. The single "Axel F" by Crazy Frog became the most sold single worldwide in 2005 topping the charts in more than 30 countries.

In 2007 Boss accepted an offer from Universal Music and founded B1 Recordings as a joint venture with Universal Music Germany.

Releasing hits by artists such as Stromae (Alors on Danse), Edward Maya (Stereo Love), Pitbull (I know you want me), Lucenzo & Don Omar (Danza Kuduro) and Klingande (Jubel), B1 Recordings frequently topped the charts.

B1 Recordings´ release of the single "Ai Se Eu Te Pego!" by Brazilian artist Michel Teló, which came out at the end of 2011, was a worldwide hit, reaching no 1 in Germany, Austria and Switzerland and it was the most downloaded song in Germany at the time. Two more releases of B1 are in the Top 10 of the most downloaded songs in Germany ever: Gotye's "Somebody That I Used to Know", and Israel Kamakawiwo`ole (IZ) "Over The Rainbow".

In 2014 Boss entered a long-term partnership with Sony Music Entertainment. His label B1 Recordings and Sony have since been working exclusively together on new releases. He also holds the global position of Executive Vice President A&R.

In 2019 B1 Recordings expanded its presence into new markets with France, the UK and Russia which hold their own local representative B1 label within the Sony Music structure.

With Sony Wolfgang Boss was instrumental in the signing of electronic music super star artists like Kygo, Martin Garrix and Paul Kalkbrenner and he is part of the A&R team of these artists helping them creating global hits like Garrix´ ´Scared to be Lonely´ and Kygo´s ´Remind me to Forget´.

In 2018, B1 Recordings released the track "In My Mind" by Lithuanian Producer Dynoro which went to #1 in 13 countries – ranking Shazam's global No.1 for eight weeks – was #1 in the German charts for almost three months and 2018's most successful song. The track amassed more than 1.5 billion streams. 

A year later, Boss saw another success with Grammy for Best Remixed Recording awarded hit single ‘Roses (Imanbek Remix)’ by US- Rapper SAINt JHN. The Remix production of Kazakhstan-based Producer Imanbek  topped several Charts reaching #1 in numerous countries including UK, Ireland, Australia, Netherlands, NZ, Belgium, Hungary, Czech Republic and Slovakia. The track held the Global Shazam #1 for 13 consecutive weeks and reached Top 5 of the US BillboardHot 100. In late 2020, ‘Roses (Imanbek Remix) went on to amass 1 billion streams on Spotify and 2 billion streams across all platforms within a year of its release. In 2020, Boss released a remix cover of 'Goosebumps' by Spanish Producer HVME  which claimed top global positions. The track was eventually re-released as a Joint Venture between B1 & Epic Records in early 2021 with Travis Scott as the leading artist. Both versions together have reached more than a billion streams on Spotify.

In 2022, B1 Recordings released the  Hit Single 'Deep Down' by Brazilian No.1 DJ Alok, Ella Eyre, Kenny Dope and Never Dull which topped global Spotify playlists and was added to several Top 50 charts in airplay, commercial and shazam with the UK as the leading market, followed by 'All By Myself' a collaboration between Alok, Sigala and Ellie Goulding and 'Work With My Love' that saw Alok working with James Arthur continuing the success of the previous releases.

To date, Boss has overseen and released a substantial body of hit singles that have collated more than 1 billion streams on Spotify alone, including: Saint Jhn - Roses (Imanbek Remix) ; Dynoro - In My Mind ; Travis Scott X HVME / HVME - Goosebumps; Regard - Ride It; Kygo & Selena Gomez - It Ain`t Me; Martin Garrix - Scared to be Lonely; Martin Garrix - In The Name Of Love; J Balvin & Willy William - Mi Gente; Gotye - Somebody that I Used To Know; Don Omar & Lucenzo - Danza Kuduro; Kygo - Firestone.

Awards 
At the German ECHO 2011 music awards on 25 March 2011, Boss and Jon de Mello received the Hit of the Year ECHO for Over the Rainbow by Israel Kamakawiwo’ole. The Hawaiian singer, often known simply as IZ, recorded the song three years before his death in 1997. Boss bought the rights to release the single in Europe in 2010. Over the Rainbow topped the German charts for four months in late 2010 and early 2011, selling over 800,000 copies, which made it the top-selling single of 2010 and the most downloaded song of all time in Germany at that time. The song and the corresponding album Facing Future have also enjoyed success outside Germany. In France, for example, the single reached number one and the album went platinum.

Productions/releases 
 Speedy feat. Lumidee: Sientelo, 2003 (No.2 in France, Gold Single, No.9 in Germany)
 Haiducii: Dragostea din tei, 2004 (No.1 in AUT + CH, No.2 in Germany, Platinum Single)
 Aventura: Obsessión, 2004 (No.1 in Germany, Platinum Single)
 Aventura: We Broke the Rules, 2004 (Top 10 in D, Gold Album)
 Crazy Frog: Axel F, 2005 (No.1 in 30 countries, Multi-Platinum)
 Crazy Frog: Popcorn, 2005 (No.1 in 6 countries, Platinum)
 Crazy Frog presents Crazy Hits, 2005 (Gold Album)
 Goleo presents Bob Sinclar: Love Generation, 2006 (No.1 in Germany, Platin Single)
 Pitbull: I know you want me, 2009 (Top 10 in Germany)
 Milow: Ayo Technology, 2009 (No.2 in Germany, Platinum Single)
 Milow: Milow, 2009 (No.3 in Germany, Platinum Album)
 Stromae: "Alors on danse", 2010 (No.1 in Germany, Platinum Single)
 Edward Maya: Stereo Love, 2010 (No.3 in Germany, Platinum Single)
 Israel Kamakawiwo`ole: Over the Rainbow, 2010 (No.1 in Germany, No.1 in France, Platinum Single)
 Israel Kamakawiwo`ole: Facing Future, 2010 (Platinum Album in Germany + France)
 Avicii: Penguin / Fade Into Darkness, 2011
 Milow: North & South (Album), 2011 (Gold Album)
 Lucenzo & Don Omar: Danza Kuduro, 2011 (No. 1 in Germany, Platinum Single)
 Gotye: Somebody that I used to know, 2011 (in collaboration with Vertigo Berlin)(No. 1 in Germany, Platinum Single)
 Gotye: Making mirrors, 2011 (in collaboration with Vertigo Berlin) (Gold Album)
 Michel Teló: "Ai Se Eu Te Pego!", 2011 (No. 1 in Germany, Austria + Switzerland) (No 1 selling single 2012) (Platinum)
 Gusttavo Lima : "Balada", 2012 (No.1 in Austria + Switzerland, Platinum Germany)
 Triggerfinger : "I Follow Rivers", 2012 (No.1 Austria, Platinum Germany)
 Major Lazer : Get Free, 2012
 Arash & Sean Paul : "She Makes Me Go", 2013 (Gold Single Germany)
 Wankelmut & Emma Louise : "My Head is a Jungle", (Platinum Single Italy, Top 5 UK)
 Stromae : "Papaoutai", 2013 (Gold, Germany)
 Family of the Year : "Hero", 2013 (Gold, Germany)
 Klingande : "Jubel", 2013 (6 weeks at No.1 in Germany, Platinum)
 Alle Farben: She Moves (Far Away), 2014 (Platinum Single Germany)
 Bakermat: One Day (Vandaag), 2014 (Platinum Single Germany, Gold Single France)
 Kygo: Firestone feat. Conrad Sewell, 2014 (Platinum Single in Germany)
 Kygo: Stole The Show feat. Parson James, 2015 (Platinum Single in Germany)
 Deorro: Five More Hours feat. Chris Brown (in cooperation with Ultra Music), 2015 (Gold Single in Germany, Top 10 in 10 countries, Top 40 in 40 countries)
 Paul Kalkbrenner: 7, 2015 (#1 Album in Germany, Switzerland & Austria | Gold Album in Germany)
 Anna Naklab: Supergirl feat. Alle Farben & YOUNOTUS, 2015 (Platinum Single in Germany, Gold Single in Spain)
Sigala: Easy Love, 2015 (Gold Single in Germany)
Sigala: Sweet Lovin, 2015 (Gold Single in Germany)
 Julian Perretta: Miracle, 2016 (Gold Single in Germany)
 Era Istrefi: Bonbon, 2016 (Gold Single in Germany)
 Alle Farben: Bad Ideas, 2016 (Platinum Single in Germany)
 Alle Farben: Please Tell Rosie, 2016 (Platin Single in Germany)
 Martin Garrix feat. Bebe Rexha: In The Name Of Love, 2016 (Platinum Single in Germany)
 Alle Farben: Bad Ideas, 2016 (Platinum Single in Germany)
Kygo & Selena Gomez: It Ain't Me, 2017 (Platinum Single in Germany)
Martin Garrix & Dua Lipa: Scared to be Lonely, 2017 (Platinum Single in Germany)
 Alle Farben: Little Hollywood, 2017 (Platinum Single in Germany)
Kygo & Ellie Goulding: First Time, 2017 (Platinum Single in Germany)
J Balvin & Wily William: Mi Gente, 2017 (Platinum Single in Germany)
Martin Garrix & David Guetta: So Far Away, 2017 (Gold Single in Germany)
Kygo & Miguel: Remind Me To Forget, 2018
Kygo & Imagine Dragons: Born To Be Yours, 2018
 El Chombo: Dame Tu Cosita, 2018 (No.1 watched video worldwide on YouTube for 4 weeks)
Dynoro & Gigi D`Agostino: In My Mind, 2018 (No.1 Germany, Austria, Switzerland, Russia, Sweden, Top 10 global Spotify charts, 2× Platinum in Germany, Single Of The Year in 2018 in Germany, Diamond Single in France)
Alle Farben & Ilira: Fading, 2018 (Platin in Switzerland & Poland, Gold in Austria) 
Sigala & Ella Eyre & Meghan Trainor featuring French Montana: Just Got Paid, 2018
Gaullin: Moonlight, 2018 (Gold Single in Germany & France)
YouNotUs & Janieck & Senex: Narcotic, 2019 (Gold in Germany & The Netherlands)
Sigala & Becky Hill: Wish You Well, 2019
Maitre Gims & Maluma: Hola Senorita, 2019
SAINt JHN - Roses (Imanbek Remix), 2019 (6× Platinum: Russia, Ireland; 4× Platinum: Turkey; 3× Platinum: Canada; 2× Platinum: Australia, Poland, Sweden, Hungary, Switzerland; Diamond: Brazil, France; Platinum: UK, Germany, Netherlands, Spain, Sweden, Norway, Denmark, Finland, Mexico, Portugal, Italy, NZ, ZA, Austria, Greece; Gold: US, Malaysia, India, Israel; #1 Ireland (8 weeks), Australia (6 weeks), Netherlands (4 weeks), UK (2 weeks), NZ (2weeks), Belgium, Hungary, Czech Republic, Slovakia; Grammy 2021 Award for Best Remixed Recording)
Regard - Ride It, 2019 (Certified Gold in UK, Germany, Canada, Denmark, Switzerland, 4× Platinum in Ireland, 2× Platinum in Australia and Netherlands and Platinum in Belgium, New Zealand & Finland)
Lucky Luke - Cooler Than Me (Gold in Germany & France), 2019
HVME - Goosebumps, 2020 (Certified Platinum in Germany)
Alok feat. Tove Lo & Ilkay Sencan - Don't Say Goodbye, 2020
Travis Scott & HVME - Goosebumps, 2021 (#1 Dance Radio US, Gold UK & France)
Dynoro & 24kGoldn - Monsters, 2021
Alok & John Legend - In My Mind, 2021
Justin Wellington feat. Small Jam - Iko Iko (My Bestie), 2021 (Gold in Germany, 2x Platinum Austria)
Goya Menor & Nektunez - Ameno Amapiano Remix, 2022
southstar - Miss You, 2022 (Gold in DE & AT) 
Alok, Ella Eyre, Kenny Dope ft. Never Dull - Deep Down, 2022
Alok, Sigala, Ellie Goulding - All By Myself, 2022
Alok & James Arthur - Work With My Love, 2023

References

External links 
 https://www.columbia.de/b1/
 https://www.bbc.co.uk/music/artists/7a67cfd0-17f4-4cf8-a0e0-0f77f80a5947

German record producers
Living people
Year of birth missing (living people)